Remo Tomasi (20 May 1932 – 28 September 2013) was an Italian speed skater. He competed in two events at the 1956 Winter Olympics.

References

1932 births
2013 deaths
Italian male speed skaters
Olympic speed skaters of Italy
Speed skaters at the 1956 Winter Olympics
Sportspeople from Bolzano